Sheila Osborne is a Canadian politician in Newfoundland and Labrador, Canada. She represented the district of St. John's West in the Newfoundland and Labrador House of Assembly from 1997 to 2011, as a member of the Progressive Conservative Party.

Osborne was first elected to the Newfoundland assembly in a 1997 by-election held after Liberal Rex Gibbons resigned his seat. Osborne announced in June 2011, that she would not seek re-election in October's provincial election.

Her son Tom was also a member of the Newfoundland and Labrador House of Assembly.

References

21st-century Canadian politicians
21st-century Canadian women politicians
Living people
Politicians from St. John's, Newfoundland and Labrador
Progressive Conservative Party of Newfoundland and Labrador MHAs
Women MHAs in Newfoundland and Labrador
Year of birth missing (living people)